Akame ga Kill! is a Japanese manga series written by Takahiro and illustrated by Tetsuya Tashiro. The story focuses on Tatsumi who is a young villager that travels to the Capital to raise money for his home only to discover a strong corruption in the area. He meets a group of assassins called Night Raid who recruit him to help them in their fight against the Empire's corruption.

The series began serialization in the April 2010 issue of Square Enix's Gangan Joker, first published on March 20, 2010. The first tankōbon volume was published on August 21, 2010, and fifteen volumes in total have been released as of February 22, 2017. The series was licensed by Yen Press in June 2014 and the first volume was released on January 20, 2015.

A prequel titled  was serialized on 11th issue of Monthly Big Gangan magazine on October 25, 2013 and ended on January 25, 2019. The series was written by Takahiro and illustrated by Kei Toru. The story focuses on Akame's past during the days she worked as an assassin for the Empire. It was compiled into ten tankōbon volumes. It was licensed by Yen Press in September 2015 and the first volume was released March 22, 2016.

Takahiro published a sequel manga titled  with art by strelka in Monthly Big Gangan from June 24, 2017, to June 24, 2022. Yen Press has licensed the manga, and the publisher is releasing new chapters simultaneously with Japan.

Akame ga Kill!

|}

Akame ga Kill! Zero

Hinowa ga Crush!

Notes

References

Akame ga Kill!